Chapter V is the fifth studio album by American R&B recording artist Trey Songz. It was released on August 21, 2012, by Atlantic Records. It was produced by several record producers, including Troy Taylor, Eric Hudson, Rico Love, and Benny Blanco, among others. Recording sessions for the album took place at several recording studios in Miami—Circle House Studios and Songbook Miami Studios—and New York City—Downtown Music Studios, Engine Room Audio, Icon Studio, Lotzah Matzah Studios, and Premier Digital—as well as Stanley House Studios in London.

The album debuted at number one on the US Billboard 200, selling 135,000 copies in its first week. It was promoted with four singles, including the Grammy nominated hit "Heart Attack" UK hit "Simply Amazing" and US hit 2 Reasons. Upon its release, Chapter V received generally positive reviews from music critics, who complimented its sound and Songz' singing, although some were ambivalent towards its songwriting and themes.

Release and promotion 
Chapter V was released on August 21, 2012, by Atlantic Records, and on August 17 as a digital download. Trey Songz toured in promotion of the album on his Anticipation 2our, a tour spanning from February 9 to March 11, 2012, in North America. Rapper Big Sean was the tour's supporting act. Music videos for "Hail Mary" and "Dive In", directed by Justin Francis, were released, on August 20 and October 7, respectively. He also toured in 2012 on the Chapter V World Tour.

The album's lead single, "Heart Attack", was released as a digital download on March 26, 2012. It charted at number 35 on the Billboard Hot 100, and number 28 on the UK Singles Chart. Its music video was released on May 4 and featured Kelly Rowland playing Songz' love interest. The second single "2 Reasons" was released on June 12. Its video was premiered on June 12 by BET's 106 & Park. "Simply Amazing" was released in the United Kingdom on August 12. It charted at number eight in the UK. Its music video, directed by Justin Francis, was released on July 23. "Never Again" was released as a single in the UK in November. Its music video was released on November 21.

Critical reception

Chapter V received generally positive reviews from contemporary music critics. At Metacritic, which assigns a normalized rating out of 100 to reviews from mainstream critics, the album received an average score of 68, based on eight reviews. Allmusic's Andy Kellman commended Songz for "singing about what [he] can do for — rather than to" his female subjects and stated, "Those who tire of the coarse metaphors, disrobing scenes, and 'panty wetter' talk can get lost in the sleek, layered work of Troy Taylor and his associates. The snaking rhythms are just as remarkable as the hypnotic synthesizer textures." Sarah Godfrey of The Washington Post complimented Songz' "signature blend of soft-core imagery and sweet nothings" and wrote that the album "highlights Songz’s unique role in R&B: He bridges the gap between sexless boy bands and unromantic raunchy singers, between young guys who sing shallow songs about strip clubs and old guys who sing heavy songs about their divorces." Jon Caramanica of The New York Times dubbed it "one of his most consistently strong albums" in spite of the potential "conundrum" of drawing on R. Kelly and Usher as influences.

In a mixed review, Mikael Wood of the Los Angeles Times was ambivalent towards its boudior-themed songs and felt that Songz "might be R&B's most single-minded star". Jody Rosen of Rolling Stone found it to be "full of big ballads and bigger club beats that take dead aim at the pop mainstream", but added that "Songz is at his best playing to his R&B base". BBC Music's Natalie Shaw viewed that Songz does not "reveal a deeper side to his songwriting" until track nine. Ken Capobianco of The Boston Globe felt that it "could use editing", but wrote that "throughout this he sings with urgency and expressiveness." Although he viewed that Songz lacks "natural charisma", Alex Macpherson of The Guardian commended Troy Taylor for making the album "admirably cohesive" and Songz for "mov[ing] into traditional R Kelly territory", writing that it "helps to reinforce Songz's status as the formidable understudy of R&B."

Commercial performance 
The album debuted at number one on the US Billboard 200 chart, with first week sales of 135,000 copies. It was Songz' first album to top the chart. Chapter V was also Songz' first album to chart in the United Kingdom, where it peaked at number 10 on the UK Albums Chart. As of October 3, 2012, the album has sold 238,400 copies in the United States, according to Nielsen SoundScan. In August 2016, the album was certified gold by the Recording Industry Association of America (RIAA) for combined sales and streaming equivalent units of over 500,000 units.

Track listing 

Notes
 – co-production
 – additional production

Personnel 
Credits for Chapter V adapted from Allmusic.

 Diego Avendaño – assistant
 Darius Barnes – producer
 Edgar Bautista – assistant
 Nick Bilardello – art direction, design
 Benny Blanco – engineer, instrumentation, producer, programming
 Jo Jo Brim – management
 Darhyl Camper – producer
 Angelo Caputo – assistant engineer
 Joseph Caravalho – assistant
 Mike Caren – A&R
 Chris Celestine – general manager
 Cameron Chambers – guitar
 Mark B. Christensen – mastering
 Talia Coles – stylist
 Philip Cook – programming
 Anthony Daniel – engineer
 Diddy – featured artist
 Jimmy Fontaine – photography
 Lanre Gaba – A&R
 Josh Garrison – producer
 Serban Ghenea – mixing
 Chuck Gibson – guitar
 John Hanes – engineer
 Dionne Harper – marketing
 Trehy Harris – assistant
 Benoit Holliger – assistant
 Jean-Marie Horvat – mixing
 Matt Huber – assistant
 Eric Hudson – producer
 Jaycen Joshua – mixing
 Lil Wayne – featured artist
 Kevin Liles – management
 Rico Love – background vocals, producer, vocals
 Andrew Luftman – assistant
 Robert Marks – mixing
 Thurston McCrea – engineer
 John McGee – producer
 Pierre Medor – engineer
 Meek Mill – featured artist
 Edrick Miles – producer
 Dwayne Nesmith – keyboards, producer, programming
 Alex Neverson – producer
 Phillip Peterson – strings
 Matt Prime – guitar, keyboards, producer, programming
 Tony Rey – vocal engineer
 Rick Ross – featured artist
 Alagy Sanneh – producer
 Phil Seaford – assistant
 Sevyn – vocals
 Jerren "J-Kits" Spruill – additional production, producer
 Zach Steele – engineer
 Skyy Stylez – producer
 T.I. – featured artist
 Troy Taylor – additional production, bass, executive producer, keyboards, percussion, piano, producer
 Sean Thompson – assistant
 Carolyn Tracey – package production
 Trey Songz – executive producer, primary artist, vocals
 Ty$ – additional production, guitar
 Christopher Umana – producer
 Scott "Yarmov" Yarmovsky – production coordination
 Young Jeezy – featured artist

Charts

Weekly charts

Year-end charts

Certifications

Release history

References

External links 
 

2012 albums
Trey Songz albums
Atlantic Records albums
Albums produced by Drumma Boy
Albums produced by Boi-1da
Albums produced by Eric Hudson
Albums produced by Rico Love
Albums produced by Benny Blanco
Albums produced by Troy Taylor (record producer)